The temple town is a major hub for several film industries. Several film producers from South India and North India add the scenic beauty of ghats of Varanasi. Being well connected to the major cities across India makes it approachable. A small number of Bhojpuri movies are shot too.

Films

 Agnyaathavaasi
 Angrezi Mein Kehte Hain
 Aparajito
 Banaras
Banaras (a Malayalam film)
 Bas Itna Sa Khwaab Hai
 Bhaiaji Superhit
 Brahmotsavam
 Bunty Aur Babli
 Chokher Bali
 Dharm
 Dream Girl
 Feast of Varanasi
 Half Girlfriend
 Hotel Salvation
 Ganges: River to Heaven
 Ghatak
 Gangs of Wasseypur
 Gypsy
Guns of Banaras
 Jaya Ganga
 Jolly LLB 2
 Indra
 ISmart Shankar
 Issaq
 Joi Baba Felunath
 Junction Varanasi
 Laaga Chunari Mein Daag
 Manikarnika: The Queen of Jhansi
 Masaan
 Mohalla Assi
 Mukkabaaz
 Mulk
 Mumbai Varanasi Express
 Naan Kadavul
 Odiyan
 Raanjhanaa
 Ram Teri Ganga Maili
 Piku
 Setters 
 Shubh Mangal Zyada Saavdhan
 Super 30
 The Curious Case of Benjamin Button
 The Last Color
 2006 Varanasi – The Untold
 Water
 Yamla Pagla Deewana

OTT Platforms

 Asur
 Bahut Hua Sammaan
 Bicchoo Ka Khel
 Helmet
 Mirzapur
 Madhuri Talkies
 Raktanchal
 A Suitable Boy
 Virgin Bhasskar

See also

Varanasi
List of tourist attractions in Varanasi

References

Films shot in Varanasi
Varanasi-related lists
Varanasi